Heinz Vollmar (26 April 1936 – 12 October 1987) was a Saarland and German football player.

Vollmar belongs to those Germany international players (war-year examples include Ernest Wilimowski, Franz Binder, Max Merkel; latest examples include Ulf Kirsten, Andreas Thom, Matthias Sammer etc.) that have represented other nations in their international career as well. He was a tricky winger who mostly played in the outside left position.

Vollmar was a citizen of Saarland, what came under French protectorate after World War II, and wore the Saarland colours four times, scoring four in these matches. His final Saarland appearance happened under then Saarland coach Helmut Schön less than a month before his first West Germany match under coach Sepp Herberger: On 6 June 1956, Saarland lost 2–3 to the Netherlands in Amsterdam with Vollmar scoring one goal that evening.

With the population of Saarland to join West Germany, via a referendum taken place already in 1955, Vollmar's first of twelve West Germany caps was on 30 June 1956, in Stockholm versus Sweden. He scored his first of three goals against Belgium six months later. Despite the fact a year had passed since his final West Germany match, Heinz Vollmar was part of the West German squad at the 1962 FIFA World Cup.

References

External links
 International career
 

Saar footballers
German footballers
Saarland international footballers
Germany international footballers
1. FC Saarbrücken players
Bundesliga players
1962 FIFA World Cup players
Footballers from Saarland
1936 births
1987 deaths
Dual internationalists (football)
Association football forwards
SV St. Ingbert 1945 players